Oman Medical College is the second medical college in the Sultanate of Oman, and is situated in Muscat and Sohar in the North Batinha region. The pharmacy campus is located in Bowsher. First year is taught as a foundation course and second and third years are completed before the medical school years of Sohar campus. Some part of the coursework is also completed in Rustaq with students taking courses with doctors at Rustaq hospital. The associated hospital with the Sohar campus is Sohar hospital, one of the biggest governmental hospitals in the country. Total course work spans over a period of 7 years and the degree awarded is that of a Doctor of Medicine (M.D). The Bowsher campus also offers a degree in pharmacy (Bachelor of Science in Pharmacy). This degree spans over a period of 5 and a half years.

External links
 Official website

Sohar
Colleges in Oman